"Hagnagora" ignipennis is a species of moth of the family Geometridae first described by Paul Dognin in 1913. It is found in Colombia.

Taxonomy
The species was provisionally removed from the genus Hagnagora. The wing pattern and particularly the wing shape diverge strongly from species in this genus.

References

Moths described in 1913
Larentiinae